Hurley is the eighth studio album by American rock band Weezer, released on September 10, 2010 by Epitaph Records. The album was produced by Rivers Cuomo and Shawn Everett, and, similar to their previous album Raditude, features songs co-written with songwriters outside of the band.

Preceded by the single "Memories", Hurley debuted at number six on the US Billboard 200, with over 45,000 units sold in its first week of sales.

Background
In late 2009, Weezer revealed the group's seventh album, Raditude. Compared to the band's other albums, it received a lukewarm response. In December, it was revealed that the band was no longer signed to Geffen Records. The band members stated that new material would still be released, but were unsure of the means, whether it be self-released, released online, or released via another label. Eventually, the band was signed to the independent label Epitaph.

Composition
Critics have labeled the album as alternative rock, power pop, and pop rock.

Music and lyrics
In July 2010, Weezer began recording the follow-up to Raditude. Rivers Cuomo said of the album, "There's definitely going to be more raw rock energy on this one." In August 2010, the track list was revealed.

The first track and single from the album was "Memories", also featured in a Guitar Hero track pack alongside "Buddy Holly" and "(If You're Wondering If I Want You To) I Want You To", released simultaneously with the album on September 14. The second single released was "Hang On" on February 15 to U.S. Alternative radio.

The music video for "Memories" also features members of Jackass on backing vocals, and clips from the upcoming movie Jackass 3-D. AP magazine described the high-energy track as "Andrew W.K. covering The Killers."

The string tracks in "Memories" and "Unspoken", as well as in bonus tracks "All My Friends Are Insects" and "Represent", were recorded at the Banff Centre in Banff, Alberta, Canada.

"Hang On", co-written by Rick Nowels, features Canadian actor Michael Cera on backing vocals and mandolin.

The album's closer, "Time Flies", co-written by country singer and songwriter Mac Davis, features a lo-fi, folk-country sound, while also being compared to the music of Led Zeppelin.

Artwork and title
The album's cover is a picture of American actor Jorge Garcia, who portrayed Hugo "Hurley" Reyes on the television series Lost from 2004 to 2010. The photo itself is a small cropping of an original picture of Cuomo being embraced by Garcia, taken in the green room of Lopez Tonight while Weezer and Jorge Garcia were taping segments for separate shows on the same day.

Originally, the band was going to self-title the album for a fourth time, but decided against it, since the band figured most fans would simply refer to the album as the "Hurley" album. Guitarist Brian Bell stated publicly that the record was named after clothing company Hurley International, whose bosses he said funded the recording and provided a studio for recording sessions. Bell later claimed that he was mistaken and that the album was in fact named after the Lost character and not the clothing company. However, the group subsequently worked with the clothing manufacturer to create a Weezer-branded clothing line.

Promotion
Weezer used internet streaming service YouTube as a way to promote the album. Weezer loaned itself to 15 amateur online video producers, "going along with whatever plans the creator could execute in about 30 minutes." The band used many of the popular channels to promote themselves, such as Barely Political, Tay Zonday, Dave Days, Magic Hugs, Fred Figglehorn, Ray William Johnson, and The Annoying Orange. The Gregory Brothers solicited musical and vocal contributions from the band on one of its signature topical compositions—built around melodically enhanced speeches by Rep. Charles Rangel and President Obama. Weezer called the promotion "The YouTube Invasion". With the exception of the lead single, none of this album has been played live, though "Hang On" and "Unspoken" were played at several late 2010 concerts.

Critical reception

The review aggregator website Metacritic gave the album an average score of 68%, which indicates "generally favorable reviews". After the album was leaked to the internet, Weezer made it available for free streaming on the band's MySpace page. Many music sites and magazines used this as an opportunity to review the album before it was tangibly released to the public.

Michael Roffman of Consequence of Sound wrote "From the get-go, Hurley feels more personal and at heart than anything on Raditude". NME'''s Rob Parker comments "...it’s got the charm and spark of the Weezer of old, and that’s a quality you just can’t fake." The New York Times writer Jon Caramanica regards it as "the group’s strongest album in recent years." Adam Thomas at Sputnikmusic considered it an improvement over the band's previous three albums, saying "Hurley proves that Rivers still has some gas left in the tank." Jeff Jensen of Entertainment Weekly regarded it as a "...terrific rebound, a blast of sonic sweetness that finds the band integrating '60s pop influences". At AllMusic, Stephen Thomas Erlewine noted "Sometimes, the quirks become overwhelming...but usually the melodies and riffs are clean, simple, and powerful, hooking immediately and sticking around for a while.

Many critics favorably compared the songs on Hurley to the songs from Weezer's first three albums. Scott Heisel at Alternative Press and Ben Patashnik of Rock Sound compared the song "Ruling Me" to the songs from the band's self-titled debut and second self-titled album. Alternative Press said that the song "is a distant cousin of both the Blue Album's "No One Else" and the Green Album's "Don't Let Go", serving as a straight-ahead slab of power-pop." Rock Sound said that "The chugging guitars of the verse [of "Ruling Me"] hearken back to Green-era Weezer, which is all very pleasant, but it's the chorus that rockets "Ruling Me" into a different league." Rolling Stones Jon Dolan called the song "Where's My Sex" "Pinkerton-esque".

Accolades

Commercial performance
Hurley debuted at number six on the Billboard 200 with 45,000 units sold, making it Weezer's sixth top 10 album, as well as the band's sixth top 10 album in a row. Despite peaking higher than Raditude, Hurley sold 21,000 fewer units in its first week than the former. During its second week of release, the album fell to number 24, selling 11,235 copies.

Track listing

PersonnelWeezerBrian Bell
Rivers Cuomo
Scott Shriner
Patrick WilsonAdditional musiciansJohnny Knoxville, Wee Man, Ryan Dunn, Dave England, Preston Lacy, April Margera, Ehren McGhehey, Steve-O – gang vocals ("Memories")
 Chris Pontius – gang vocals and additional guitar ("Memories")
 Dan Wilson – additional background vocals ("Ruling Me")
 Alex Greenwald – orchestration ("Trainwrecks")
 Desmond Child – piano ("Trainwrecks")
 Blake Mills – keyboard ("Trainwrecks")
 Avram Sills – percussion ("Unspoken")
 Greg Vail – flute ("Unspoken")
 Ryan Adams – guitar and bass ("Run Away")
 Tony Berg – hurdy-gurdy ("Hang On")
 Michael Cera – mandolin and background vocals ("Hang On")
 Jimmy Harry – additional guitar ("Smart Girls")Design Andy Mueller – art direction and design
 Daniel Field – cover photography
 Danny Clinch – band photographStrings Tyler Fitzmaurice, Allegra Young – string arrangements, conductor
 Simon Gamache, Florian Krentz – orchestration
 Theresa Leonard – string engineer, percussion, production coordinator
 Florian Krentz, Sergey Martynyuk – production assistants
 Noland Bouvier, Gonzalo Garcia, Jim Hewins, Pattie Phillips, Shelley Uprichard – string engineers
 John Batchelder, Carrie Campbell, Cat Gray, Kellen McDaniel, Kayleigh "Kmizzle" Miller, Brian Sherwood – viola
 Emily Botel, Yoon-Kyung "YK" Shin, Maria Van der Sloot, Jeremy Van Sylke, Allegra Young – violin
 Devin Franco, Gabrielle Hamann-Guennette, Cecilia Huerta – cello
 Travis Harrison – octa bassProduction'''
 Rivers Cuomo – producer
 Shawn Everett – producer, engineer, mixing 
 Marc McClusky – mixing 
 John Goodmanson – mixing 
 Todd Bergman – assistant engineer
 Eric Steinman – assistant engineer
 Chesare Marolo – assistant engineer
 James Musshom – assistant engineer
 Cameron Webb – additional recording 
 Dave Collins – mastering

Charts

References

External links

 Hurley at YouTube (streamed copy where licensed)
 

Weezer albums
2010 albums
Epitaph Records albums
Lost (TV series)